This is a list of Pittsburgh Penguins owners. There have been 10 ownership groups for the Penguins franchise since the team's founding in 1967. The Penguins' current owner is Mario Lemieux, who purchased the Penguins in 1999 and brought the club out of bankruptcy. Lemieux Group LP also worked out a deal with the city of Pittsburgh in 2007 for a new multi-purpose arena, ensuring that the franchise remains in Pittsburgh.

Ownerships

See also
 List of Pittsburgh Penguins head coaches
 List of Pittsburgh Penguins players

References

 
owners